Photodissociation, photolysis, photodecomposition, or photofragmentation is a chemical reaction in which molecules of a chemical compound are broken down by photons. It is defined as the interaction of one or more photons with one target molecule.

Photodissociation is not limited to visible light.  Any photon with sufficient energy can affect the chemical bonds of a chemical compound.  Since a photon's energy is inversely proportional to its wavelength, electromagnetic radiations with the energy of visible light or higher, such as ultraviolet light, X-rays, and gamma rays can induce such reactions.

Photolysis in photosynthesis
Photolysis is part of the light-dependent reaction or light phase or photochemical phase or Hill reaction of photosynthesis. The general reaction of photosynthetic photolysis can be given in terms of photons as:

The chemical nature of "A" depends on the type of organism.  Purple sulfur bacteria oxidize hydrogen sulfide to sulfur (S). In oxygenic photosynthesis, water serves as a substrate for photolysis resulting in the generation of diatomic oxygen.  This is the process which returns oxygen to Earth's atmosphere. Photolysis of water occurs in the thylakoids of cyanobacteria and the chloroplasts of green algae and plants.

Energy transfer models
The conventional semi-classical model describes the photosynthetic energy transfer process as one in which excitation energy hops from light-capturing pigment molecules to reaction center molecules step-by-step down the molecular energy ladder.

The effectiveness of photons of different wavelengths depends on the absorption spectra of the photosynthetic pigments in the organism. Chlorophylls absorb light in the violet-blue and red parts of the spectrum, while accessory pigments capture other wavelengths as well. The phycobilins of red algae absorb blue-green light which penetrates deeper into water than red light, enabling them to photosynthesize in deep waters. Each absorbed photon causes the formation of an exciton (an electron excited to a higher energy state) in the pigment molecule. The energy of the exciton is transferred to a chlorophyll molecule (P680, where P stands for pigment and 680 for its absorption maximum at 680 nm) in the reaction center of photosystem II via resonance energy transfer. P680 can also directly absorb a photon at a suitable wavelength.

Photolysis during photosynthesis occurs in a series of light-driven oxidation events. The energized electron (exciton) of P680 is captured by a primary electron acceptor of the photosynthetic electron transport chain and thus exits photosystem II. In order to repeat the reaction, the electron in the reaction center needs to be replenished. This occurs by oxidation of water in the case of oxygenic photosynthesis. The electron-deficient reaction center of photosystem II (P680*) is the strongest biological oxidizing agent yet discovered, which allows it to break apart molecules as stable as water.

The water-splitting reaction is catalyzed by the oxygen evolving complex of photosystem II. This protein-bound inorganic complex contains four manganese ions, plus calcium and chloride ions as cofactors. Two water molecules are complexed by the manganese cluster, which then undergoes a series of four electron removals (oxidations) to replenish the reaction center of photosystem II. At the end of this cycle, free oxygen is generated and the hydrogen of the water molecules has been converted to four protons released into the thylakoid lumen (Dolai's S-state diagrams).

These protons, as well as additional protons pumped across the thylakoid membrane coupled with the electron transport chain, form a proton gradient across the membrane that drives photophosphorylation and thus the generation of chemical energy in the form of adenosine triphosphate (ATP). The electrons reach the P700 reaction center of photosystem I where they are energized again by light. They are passed down another electron transport chain and finally combine with the coenzyme  and protons outside the thylakoids to form NADPH. Thus, the net oxidation reaction of water photolysis can be written as:

The free energy change for this reaction is 102 kilocalories per mole. Since the energy of light at 700 nm is about 40 kilocalories per mole of photons, approximately 320 kilocalories of light energy are available for the reaction. Therefore, approximately one-third of the available light energy is captured as NADPH during photolysis and electron transfer. An equal amount of ATP is generated by the resulting proton gradient. Oxygen as a byproduct is of no further use to the reaction and thus released into the atmosphere.

Quantum models

In 2007 a quantum model was proposed by Graham Fleming and his co-workers which includes the possibility that photosynthetic energy transfer might involve quantum oscillations, explaining its unusually high efficiency.

According to Fleming there is direct evidence that remarkably long-lived wavelike electronic quantum coherence plays an important part in energy transfer processes during photosynthesis, which can explain the extreme efficiency of the energy transfer because it enables the system to sample all the potential energy pathways, with low loss, and choose the most efficient one. This claim has, however, since been proven wrong in several publications.

This approach has been further investigated by Gregory Scholes and his team at the University of Toronto, which in early 2010 published research results that indicate that some marine algae make use of quantum-coherent electronic energy transfer (EET) to enhance the efficiency of their energy harnessing.

Photoinduced proton transfer
Photoacids are molecules that upon light absorption undergo a proton transfer to form the photobase.
AH ->[h\nu] A^- + H^+

In these reactions the dissociation occurs in the electronically excited state. After proton transfer and relaxation to the electronic ground state, the proton and acid recombine to form the photoacid again.

Photoacids are a convenient source to induce pH jumps in ultrafast laser spectroscopy experiments.

Photolysis in the atmosphere
Photolysis occurs in the atmosphere as part of a series of reactions by which primary pollutants such as hydrocarbons and nitrogen oxides react to form secondary pollutants such as peroxyacyl nitrates. See Photochemical smog.

The two most important photodissociation reactions in the troposphere are firstly:

which generates an excited oxygen atom which can react with water to give the hydroxyl radical:
O(^1D) + H2O -> 2 ^{*} OH

The hydroxyl radical is central to atmospheric chemistry as it initiates the oxidation of hydrocarbons in the atmosphere and so acts as a detergent.

Secondly the reaction:

is a key reaction in the formation of tropospheric ozone.

The formation of the ozone layer is also caused by photodissociation. Ozone in the Earth's stratosphere is created by ultraviolet light striking oxygen molecules containing two oxygen atoms, splitting them into individual oxygen atoms (atomic oxygen). The atomic oxygen then combines with unbroken  to create ozone, . In addition, photolysis is the process by which CFCs are broken down in the upper atmosphere to form ozone-destroying chlorine free radicals.

Astrophysics
In astrophysics, photodissociation is one of the major processes through which molecules are broken down (but new molecules are being formed). Because of the vacuum of the interstellar medium, molecules and free radicals can exist for a long time. Photodissociation is the main path by which molecules are broken down. Photodissociation rates are important in the study of the composition of interstellar clouds in which stars are formed.

Examples of photodissociation in the interstellar medium are ( is the energy of a single photon of frequency ):
H2O ->[h\nu] H + OH
CH4 ->[h\nu] CH3 + H

Atmospheric gamma-ray bursts

Currently orbiting satellites detect an average of about one gamma-ray burst per day. Because gamma-ray bursts are visible to distances encompassing most of the observable universe, a volume encompassing many billions of galaxies, this suggests that gamma-ray bursts must be exceedingly rare events per galaxy.

Measuring the exact rate of gamma-ray bursts is difficult, but for a galaxy of approximately the same size as the Milky Way, the expected rate (for long GRBs) is about one burst every 100,000 to 1,000,000 years. Only a few percent of these would be beamed toward Earth. Estimates of rates of short GRBs are even more uncertain because of the unknown beaming fraction, but are probably comparable.

A gamma-ray burst in the Milky Way, if close enough to Earth and beamed toward it, could have significant effects on the biosphere. The absorption of radiation in the atmosphere would cause photodissociation of nitrogen, generating nitric oxide that would act as a catalyst to destroy ozone.

The atmospheric photodissociation
 N2 -> 2N
 O2 -> 2O
 CO2 -> C + 2O
 H2O -> 2H + O
 2NH3 -> 3H2 + N2
would yield
 NO2 (consumes up to 400 ozone molecules)
 CH2 (nominal)
 CH4 (nominal)
 CO2

(incomplete)

According to a 2004 study, a GRB at a distance of about a kiloparsec could destroy up to half of Earth's ozone layer; the direct UV irradiation from the burst combined with additional solar UV radiation passing through the diminished ozone layer could then have potentially significant impacts on the food chain and potentially trigger a mass extinction. The authors estimate that one such burst is expected per billion years, and hypothesize that the Ordovician-Silurian extinction event could have been the result of such a burst.

There are strong indications that long gamma-ray bursts preferentially or exclusively occur in regions of low metallicity. Because the Milky Way has been metal-rich since before the Earth formed, this effect may diminish or even eliminate the possibility that a long gamma-ray burst has occurred within the Milky Way within the past billion years. No such metallicity biases are known for short gamma-ray bursts. Thus, depending on their local rate and beaming properties, the possibility for a nearby event to have had a large impact on Earth at some point in geological time may still be significant.

Multiple-photon dissociation
Single photons in the infrared spectral range usually are not energetic enough for direct photodissociation of molecules. However, after absorption of multiple infrared photons a molecule may gain internal energy to overcome its barrier for dissociation. Multiple-photon dissociation (MPD; IRMPD with infrared radiation) can be achieved by applying high-power lasers, e.g. a carbon dioxide laser, or a free-electron laser, or by long interaction times of the molecule with the radiation field without the possibility for rapid cooling, e.g. by collisions. The latter method allows even for MPD induced by black-body radiation, a technique called blackbody infrared radiative dissociation (BIRD).

See also
Flash photolysis
Photocatalysis
Photochemistry
Photohydrogen

References

Astrophysics
Chemical reactions
Photochemistry
Photosynthesis
Reaction mechanisms